Janette Husárová and Dominique Van Roost were the defending champions but they competed with different partners that year, Husárová with Julie Halard-Decugis and Van Roost with Laura Golarsa.

Golarsa and Van Roost lost in the quarterfinals to Halard-Decugis and Husárová.

Halard-Decugis and Husárová lost in the final 7–6, 6–4 against Nana Miyagi and Tamarine Tanasugarn.

Seeds
Champion seeds are indicated in bold text while text in italics indicates the round in which those seeds were eliminated.

 Rika Hiraki /  Mercedes Paz (first round)
 Nana Miyagi /  Tamarine Tanasugarn (champions)
 Els Callens /  Ginger Helgeson-Nielsen (quarterfinals)
 Silvia Farina /  Barbara Schett (semifinals)

Draw

External links
 ITF tournament edition details

WTA Auckland Open
ASB Classic